Kim Sang-uh (born 11 June 1994) is a South Korean footballer and now playing with Changwon City FC  playing in the K3 League

Career statistics

Club

Notes

References

Living people
South Korean footballers
South Korean expatriate footballers
Association football defenders
Malaysia Super League players
Gyeongnam FC players
PKNP FC players
Expatriate footballers in Malaysia
South Korean expatriate sportspeople in Malaysia
1994 births
People from Changwon
Sportspeople from South Gyeongsang Province